Somersby Airfield (ICAO: YSMB, IATA: GOS) is an airfield located in Somersby, New South Wales, Australia. It is the sole aerodrome in Somersby, and does not serve scheduled commercial traffic.

The airfield is operated by Somersby Airfield Pty Ltd.

Facilities 
Somersby airport consists of a single runway and various hangars. It has a windsock as a runway feature and an aviation fuel supply. It also has a water supply and lavatories as passenger facilities.

Operations 
Microlight Adventures, a company that provides recreational joy flights on microlight aircraft, is based at Somersby airfield. Somersby occasionally serves general aviation traffic.

Radio procedures 
Somersby has no control center and pilots communicate over a Common Traffic Advisory Frequency.

References

Airports in New South Wales